William Ralph Wood (9 June 1946 – October 2000) was a male diver who competed for England. He competed in the 1964 Summer Olympics.

He also represented England in the 10 metres platform at the 1962 British Empire and Commonwealth Games in Perth, Western Australia. He finished just outside the medals in fourth place.

References

External links 
 

1946 births
2000 deaths
English male divers
Divers at the 1962 British Empire and Commonwealth Games
Olympic divers of Great Britain
Divers at the 1964 Summer Olympics
Commonwealth Games competitors for England